NSS-5 (Formerly known as Intelsat 803 and NSS-803) is a communications satellite operated by Intelsat and after by SES World Skies. Launched in 1997 it was operated in geostationary orbit at a longitude of 50.5 degrees east for around 14 years.

Satellite
The third of six Intelsat VIII satellites to be launched, NSS-5 was built by Lockheed Martin. It was a  spacecraft. The satellite carried a 2xLEROS-1B apogee motor for propulsion and was equipped with 38 C Band transponders and 6 Ku band transponders, powered by 2 solar cells more batteries. It was designed for a fourteen-year service life.

Launch
The launch of NSS-5 made use of an Ariane 4 rocket flying from Guiana Space Centre, Kourou, French Guiana. The launch took place at 23:58 UTC on September 23, 1997, with the spacecraft entering a geosynchronous transfer orbit. NSS-5 subsequently fired its apogee motor to achieve geostationary orbit.

See also

 1997 in spaceflight

References

Intelsat satellites
SES satellites
Spacecraft launched in 1997